Art Wander is a television and radio sports analyst, and former radio format programmer, from Buffalo, New York.

Life and career
Raised on the East Side of Buffalo, Wander took an early interest in radio, skipping classes to watch Foster Brooks and Buffalo Bob Smith perform their radio show on WGR live from the W. T. Grant department store.

After serving in the U.S. Navy, he produced radio programs for the Veterans Administration hospital system.  In 1956 he joined WKBW as a news reporter, and in 1958 hired a young Irwin Weinstein, who returned to Western New York after a stint in West Virginia, as his assistant. Weistein, later shortening his name to "Irv," eventually became an iconic Buffalo news anchor.

Wander went on to program radio stations in New York City, Chicago, Boston, Dallas, Baltimore, Atlanta, Tampa and Memphis.  At WOR-FM in New York he met the Beatles and became a friend of Brian Epstein, their manager.

In the 1980s Wander returned to Buffalo radio as a programmer and as an on-air personality in sports radio at WGKT where he earned the nicknames "the Tiny Tot of the Kilowatt" and "your private pope", which was inspired by a fan made theme song. After a quarrel with Buffalo Bills general manager Bill Polian, Wander was hired by WGR for a sports talk show, and, starting in 1996, worked in television for Empire Sports Network (and eventually Empire's radio arm, WNSA). He retired from Empire and WNSA in 2002.

Wander was inducted into the Buffalo Broadcasters Hall of Fame in 2008.

For much of the early 2010s, Wander appeared regularly as an analyst on the WBBZ-TV program "All Sports WNY" (hosted and managed by his former boss at Empire, Bob Koshinski) and writes commentary for the program's website; his last commentary is from March, 2017.

References

External links
 Art Wander columns on "All Sports WNY"

1927 births
Living people
Sports commentators
Radio personalities from Buffalo, New York